The 2008 San Jose Earthquakes season was the eleventh season of the team's existence, and the first in their return to the league after a two year hiatus.

Squad

Current squad 
As of August 18, 2009.

Club

Management

Other information

Competitions

Overall

Major League Soccer

U.S. Open Cup qualification

Source:

Standings

References

External links
The Year in American Soccer – 2008 | MLS
San Jose Earthquakes season stats | sjearthquakes.com
San Jose Earthquakes All-time Game Results | Soccerstats.us

2008
San Jose Earthquakes
San Jose Earthquakes
San Jose Earthquakes